The Tsipikan is a river in Buryatia, Russia. It is the second largest tributary of the Tsipa, after the Amalat, of the Vitim basin. There is gold mining in the banks of the river.

Course
The Tsipikan is a tributary of the Tsipa. It has its sources in the eastern slopes of the Ikat Range. First it flows northeastwards as it progresses across the mountains of the northwestern corner of the Vitim Plateau. Its course slows down and becomes marshy in the Kapylyushi lake area, south of the slopes of the Bolshoy Khapton. After a sharp turn to the southeast, and then northeast, it ends up flowing northwards meandering strongly and finally entering the eastern shore of lake Baunt. Tsipikan village is located on the right bank of the river.

The river is frozen between mid October and end of April.

See also
List of rivers of Russia

References

External links
ипикан весна, еле успели выехать речка пошла).MPG
Скала Окаменевшая девушка и горячие источники Бурятии. Видео-путешествие

Rivers of Buryatia